Monnerville station (French: Gare de Monnerville) is a French railway station located in the commune of Monnerville, Essone department in the Île de France region. Established at an altitude of 144 m, Monnerville station is situated at kilometric point (KP) 69.793 on the Paris—Bordeaux railway between the stations of Guillerval and Angerville.

As of 2022, the station is owned and operated by the SNCF and served by TER Centre-Val de Loire regional trains to Orléans, Étampes and Paris. The station is served by about 3 trains per day in each direction.

History 

The station opened on 5 May 1843, and is on the Paris–Bordeaux railway line, about  outside Paris.

Annual use 
According to SNCF estimates, annual passenger numbers for Monnerville station are as follows:

Gallery

References

External links
 

Railway stations in Essonne
TER Centre-Val de Loire
Railway stations in France opened in 1843